Wilbraham may refer to:

Surname
Aaron Wilbraham (born 1979), English professional footballer
Elizabeth Wilbraham (1632–1705), English architectural patron, possible first woman architect
George Wilbraham (1779–1852), English politician
Henry Wilbraham (1825–1883), English mathematician
Richard Wilbraham (1811–1900), British Army officer
Roger Wilbraham (1553–1616), English lawyer, Solicitor-General for Ireland under Elizabeth I
Roger Wilbraham (MP) (1743–1829), British Member of Parliament, bibliophile, antiquary, local historian and a patron of science and the arts

Given name
Wilbraham Lennox (1830-1897), English recipient of the Victoria Cross
Wilbraham Liardet (1799-1878), Australian hotelier and historian
Wilbraham Spencer Tollemache (1807–1890), English soldier and High Sheriff
Wilbraham Tollemache, 6th Earl of Dysart (1739–1821), British politician
Wilbraham Tollemache, 2nd Baron Tollemache (1832–1904), British politician

Places
Wilbraham Almshouses (disambiguation), founded by members of the Wilbraham family
Wilbraham, Massachusetts, American town
Wilbraham (CDP), Massachusetts, the central village in the town
Great Wilbraham, village in Cambridgeshire, England
Little Wilbraham, village in Cambridgeshire, England
The Wilbraham, an apartment building in Manhattan, New York City

See also 
 Edward Bootle-Wilbraham (disambiguation)